Carlos Arzani (27 November 1909 – 30 January 1952) was an Argentine driver, born in Buenos Aires, who raced private Alfa Romeos, mostly in South America. In 1937 he bought an Alfa Romeo 8C 35 and raced it at Naples before taking the car back to Argentine.

Major career wins 
 1936 Buenos Aires Grand Prix

References

Argentine racing drivers
1909 births
1952 deaths
Racing drivers from Buenos Aires